Synaphea sparsiflora is a shrub endemic to Western Australia.

It blooms between August and September producing yellow flowers.

It is found in the Wheatbelt region of Western Australia where it grows in sandy-loamy soils over laterite.

References

Eudicots of Western Australia
sparsiflora
Endemic flora of Western Australia
Plants described in 1995